Love Letters is a 1945 American film noir. The screenplay was adapted by Ayn Rand from the novel Pity My Simplicity by Christopher Massie. It was directed by William Dieterle and stars Jennifer Jones, Joseph Cotten, Ann Richards, Cecil Kellaway, Gladys Cooper and Anita Louise. The plot tells the story of a man falling in love with an amnesiac woman with two personalities, who is supposed to have killed his soldier friend.

The film was nominated for four Academy Awards, including a Best Actress in a Leading Role for Jones.

Plot
Alan Quinton, an American soldier in Italy during World War II, has been writing letters for his friend, Roger Morland, a man who admits he "never had any standards, manners or taste."  Alan has never met Victoria Remington, but regards her as a "pin-up girl of the spirit," to whom he can express feelings he has never expressed in person. He realizes that Victoria has fallen in love with the letters and is concerned that she will be disappointed by the real Roger. However, Roger abruptly leaves for paratrooper training in England.

Alan is subsequently injured on the Italian front and finds out that Roger is dead. He is having trouble readjusting to civilian life and spending time with his fiancée, Helen Wentworth. He decides to live for a while at his aunt's farm in Essex. In London, his brother takes him to a party at which he meets Dilly Carson and Singleton. He drunkenly tells them the story about falling in love with a woman he's never met, and Dilly realizes he is referring to Roger and Victoria. She tells Alan that a murder was committed and the letters were somehow involved.

Alan and his fiancée realize they aren't in love and part amicably before he moves to the farm. While in Essex, Alan visits Longreach — the road to which he addressed all the letters — and finds out that Victoria died over a year ago. He also learns that Roger was murdered by his wife, and Alan feels guilty for ever writing those letters. Back in London, Dilly informs him that Singleton is suffering from amnesia and is actually the real Victoria. She begs him not to tell Singleton that he was the one who wrote the letters because Victoria fell in love with Roger through the letters and married him solely based on them.

Dilly recounts that one day, she found Roger stabbed to death in the country house on Longreach, but Victoria was completely unable to remember what happened, even though she was holding the murder weapon right beside him. After a trial during which she cannot remember anything, she is sent to a prison psychiatric hospital for a year and then released into the care of Dilly. Victoria never regained her memory, and continues to now live as Singleton. Singleton realizes that Alan is in love with Victoria, but does not realize Victoria is actually herself. Regardless, Alan and Singleton marry after he gets permission from her adopted mother, Beatrice Remington. However, their marriage is constantly scarred by Alan's love of the "other woman."

Beatrice returns to the farm and while conversing with Singleton, Singleton begins to remember the events of that fateful night: As Roger begins to drink, Victoria rereads the letters to remind herself of the man she loves and not the bitter man she sees in front of her. Roger confesses that he is not the one who wrote the letters, and he becomes abusive. Beatrice takes a knife and is the one to stab him to death as Victoria attempts to save the letters he had thrown into the fireplace.

As Alan arrives at the house, Victoria recalls her true identity and they fall into each other's arms.

Cast

 Jennifer Jones as Singleton / Victoria Morland
 Joseph Cotten as Alan Quinton
 Ann Richards as Dilly Carson
 Cecil Kellaway as Mac
 Gladys Cooper as Beatrice Remington
 Anita Louise as Helen Wentworth
 Robert Sully as Roger Morland
 Reginald Denny as Defense counsel Phillips
 Ernest Cossart as Bishop
 Byron Barr as Derek Quinton

Adaptation and production
Rand's screenplay of Massie's book converted his story into an adaptation of Edmond Rostand's famous play Cyrano de Bergerac. Rand had admired the work since reading it in the original French in her youth. As in Rostand's play, the heroine falls in love with a soldier believing him to be the author of certain love letters that had been written for him by another soldier, including a moving note sent from the front. In Rand's version, a dimension of psychological mystery is added, and the heroine discovers the identity of the true author in time for the protagonists to experience a "happy ending."

Love Letters is the second of four films that included both Jones and Cotten leading roles. The others were Since You Went Away (1944), Duel in the Sun (1946), and Portrait of Jennie (1948).

Music
The musical score by Victor Young was also nominated for an Oscar, and featured the melody of the hit song "Love Letters", penned by Edward Heyman and performed by Dick Haymes, which has been recorded by numerous artists since 1945, including Ketty Lester, Alison Moyet, Rosemary Clooney, Nat King Cole, Elvis Presley, Jack Jones, Elton John, Del Shannon, and Sinéad O'Connor, among others. The melody or song has been reused in other films, including the Blue Velvet (1986), directed by David Lynch.

Reception
Although critical reviews were mostly negative, Love Letters succeeded at the box office. New York Times reviewer Bosley Crowther berated it as "sentimental twaddle", calling Jones' performance "fatuous", Rand's writing "a mucky muddle", and Dieterle's direction "mushy and pretentious".

Accolades

The film was nominated in several categories at the 18th Academy Awards:
 Best Actress: Jennifer Jones
 Best Art Direction (Black-and-White): Art Direction: Hans Dreier, Roland Anderson; Interior Decoration: Sam Comer, Ray Moyer
 Music (Score of a Dramatic or Comedy Picture): Victor Young
 Academy Award for Best Original Song: "Love Letters," Music by Victor Young; Lyrics by Eddie Heyman

In 2002, the American Film Institute nominated this film for AFI's 100 Years...100 Passions.

References

External links
 
 
 

1945 films
American mystery films
American romantic drama films
American black-and-white films
1945 mystery films
1945 romantic drama films
Films with screenplays by Ayn Rand
Films scored by Victor Young
Films directed by William Dieterle
Paramount Pictures films
Films produced by Hal B. Wallis
Films based on British novels
Film noir
Films about amnesia
Films about dissociative identity disorder
Films based on Cyrano de Bergerac (play)
1940s English-language films
1940s American films